Changach is a village in the Keiyo District, Elgeyo-Marakwet County, Kenya. It was formerly in the Rift Valley Province. According to the 2019 census it has a population of 1384 living in 301 households.

Economy 
The highlands provide adequate rainfall for farming and agriculture which is the economic base of the residents of the Rift Valley.  Tea from the highlands in the Kericho district enjoy a worldwide reputation, but horticulture is an important part of the district's economy and cattle raising is also practised to a large extent.

The full economic potential of the Rift Valley region is, however, far from fully exploited, though the current growth in population and improved education may change this in a near future.  People in the province are still mostly rural, but urbanisation is gradually increasing; new cities and towns contain the rural-urban migration and, provided the right policies are instituted, the Rift Valley province will be able to emerge as a national economic and cultural hub.

It is the birthplace of Kenyan runner John Kibowen.

References

Populated places in Rift Valley Province